Theo Caleb Chapman (born 31 March 2005) is an English professional footballer who plays as a midfielder for  club Barnsley.

Early life
Chapman was a gymnast and did modelling work in his youth.

Career
Chapman made his debut for Barnsley on 26 November 2022, coming on as an 86th-minute substitute for Adam Phillips in a 3–0 win over Crewe Alexandra in an FA Cup match at Oakwell. He said he was grateful to manager Michael Duff for the experience and felt he "did alright" in the brief cameo.

Career statistics

References

2005 births
Living people
English footballers
Association football midfielders
Barnsley F.C. players
Black British sportspeople
English male models